Jaydin Selsor Eierman (née Clayton: born on May 2, 1996 in Columbia, Missouri) is an American freestyle and folkstyle wrestler who competes internationally at 65 kilograms and collegiately at 141 pounds. In freestyle, Eierman is the reigning US Open National champion, medaled at the 2019 Pan American Games, earned runner–up honors from the 2018 US Open Nationals and was the 2019 US U23 National Champion. In folkstyle, he is the 2021 NCAA DI National runner-up and is the reigning B1G champion out of the University of Iowa, and was a three–time NCAA All-American and a three–time MAC champion for the Missouri Tigers, before transferring as a senior.

Folkstyle career

High school 
Eierman was born to Heather Thurston in Columbia, Missouri, where he attended Tolton High School. As a high schooler, Eierman went on to become the second undefeated wrestler in the history of Missouri to claim four MSHSAA titles in four years of varsity. Entering his senior year, he committed to the Missouri Tigers. After graduation, Jaydin changed his last name Clayton to Eierman, honoring his life-long coach Mike Eierman.

College

University of Missouri 
In his first season ('15–'16), Eierman was redshirted and compiled a 22–2 record at 133 pounds competing unattached in open tournaments. As a freshman, he moved up to 141 pounds and went on to compile a 29–7 record, claimed a Mid-American Conference title and placed fifth at the NCAAs, becoming an All-American. As a sophomore, Eierman improved his record to 34–3, repeated as the MAC champion and went on to place fourth at the NCAA championships. In his final year officially competing as a Tiger, Eierman racked up a 28–4 record, won his last MAC title (named Outstanding Wrestler) and went on to keep improving his position as an All-American at Nationals, placing third. For 2019–2020, Eierman took an Olympic redshirt. As a Tiger, Eierman went 89–14 overall.

University of Iowa 
In November 2019, Eierman transferred to the University of Iowa. Coming back to folkstyle, Eierman went 5–0 during regular season, with notable wins over Anthony Echemendia from Ohio State, Chad Red from Nebraska and Dylan Duncan from Illinois. On February 8, it was announced that the Iowa Hawkeyes wrestling team had suspended all team related activities during regular season due to COVID-19 results. At the B1G Championships, Eierman made it to the finals with another win over Chad Red, and defeated Penn State's Nick Lee to claim the title, also helping the Hawkeyes claim the team championship. At the NCAAs, Eierman got notable falls to make his first final, defeating ninth-seeded Dresden Simon and fourth seeded Tariq Wilson. In a razor close match against finalist Nick Lee, in overtime, Eierman was defeated by Lee, claiming runner-up honors and helping to Iowa's first team title in 11 years. As the NCAA granted winter athletes one more year of eligibility due to the COVID-19 pandemic, Eierman confirmed he will come back in 2021–2022, as a 25 year old, sixth-year senior.

Freestyle career

2017–2018 
During his first years competing in senior freestyle, Eierman most notably placed second at the 2018 US Open and third at the 2018 US World Team Trials. He also competed internationally, placing eight at the Polish Open.

2019–2021 
Eierman started off 2019 by placing fifth at the US Open and the US World Team Trials and followed up by becoming the US U23 National Champion and representative for the U23 World Championships. Four days before the event, it was announced that Eierman would replace Zain Retherford and attend the 2019 Pan American Games, in which he ended up bringing a bronze medal to the United States. He went on to place eight at the U23 World Championships. In 2020, Eierman placed fifth at the US National Championships, and earned the biggest win of his career when he defeated World and Olympic champion Vladimer Khinchegashvili at the HWC Showdown Open. In May 2, 2021, Eierman claimed his first US Open National Championship.

Freestyle record 

! colspan="7"| Senior Freestyle Matches
|-
!  Res.
!  Record
!  Opponent
!  Score
!  Date
!  Event
!  Location
|-
! style=background:white colspan=7 |
|-
|Win
|41–20
|align=left| Dom Demas
|style="font-size:88%"|8–4
|style="font-size:88%" rowspan=4|May 1–2, 2021
|style="font-size:88%" rowspan=4|2021 US Open National Championships
|style="text-align:left;font-size:88%;" rowspan=4|
 Coralville, Iowa
|-
|Win
|40–20
|align=left| Luke Pletcher
|style="font-size:88%"|9–5
|-
|Win
|39–20
|align=left| Noah Hermosillo
|style="font-size:88%"|Fall
|-
|Win
|38–20
|align=left| Justin Benjamin
|style="font-size:88%"|TF 18–8
|-
|Win
|37–20
|align=left| Vladimer Khinchegashvili
|style="font-size:88%"|4–1
|style="font-size:88%"|November 1, 2020
|style="font-size:88%"|HWC Showdown Open
|style="text-align:left;font-size:88%;"|
 Iowa City, Iowa
|-
! style=background:white colspan=7 |
|-
|Loss
|36–20
|align=left| Joey McKenna
|style="font-size:88%"|TF 0–10
|style="font-size:88%" rowspan=6|October 10–11, 2020
|style="font-size:88%" rowspan=6|2020 US Senior National Championships
|style="text-align:left;font-size:88%;" rowspan=6|
 Coralville, Iowa
|-
|Loss
|36–19
|align=left| Evan Henderson
|style="font-size:88%"|5–13
|-
|Win
|36–18
|align=left| Matthew Kolodzik
|style="font-size:88%"|6–5
|-
|Win
|35–18
|align=left| Ethan Lizak
|style="font-size:88%"|Fall
|-
|Win
|34–18
|align=left| Jordin Humphrey
|style="font-size:88%"|TF 11–0
|-
|Win
|33–18
|align=left| Joey Jones
|style="font-size:88%"|TF 10–0
|-
! style=background:white colspan=7 |
|-
|Loss
|32–18
|align=left| Frank Molinaro
|style="font-size:88%"|2–8
|style="font-size:88%" rowspan=4|December 20–22, 2019
|style="font-size:88%" rowspan=4|2019 US Senior National Championships
|style="text-align:left;font-size:88%;" rowspan=4|
 Fort Worth, Texas
|-
|Win
|32–17
|align=left| Rob Mathers
|style="font-size:88%"|16–15
|-
|Loss
|31–17
|align=left| Nick Lee
|style="font-size:88%"|6–10
|-
|Win
|31–16
|align=left| Ali Yousefi
|style="font-size:88%"|TF 13–0
|-
! style=background:white colspan=7 |
|-
|Loss
|30–16
|align=left| Ernazar Akmataliev
|style="font-size:88%"|13–13
|style="font-size:88%" rowspan=2|October 29, 2019 
|style="font-size:88%" rowspan=2|2019 U23 World Championships
|style="text-align:left;font-size:88%;" rowspan=2|
 Budapest, Hungary
|-
|Win
|30–15
|align=left| Abolfazl Hajipouramiji
|style="font-size:88%"|Fall
|-
! style=background:white colspan=7 |
|-
|Win
|29–15
|align=left| Agustín Destribats
|style="font-size:88%"|TF 15–4
|style="font-size:88%" rowspan=2|August 9, 2019
|style="font-size:88%" rowspan=2|2019 Pan American Games
|style="text-align:left;font-size:88%;" rowspan=2|
 Lima, Peru
|-
|Loss
|28–15
|align=left| Alejandro Valdés
|style="font-size:88%"|TF 0–10
|-
! style=background:white colspan=7 |
|-
|Win
|28–14
|align=left| Luke Pletcher
|style="font-size:88%"|9–6
|style="font-size:88%" rowspan=8|May 31 – June 2, 2019
|style="font-size:88%" rowspan=8|2019 US U23 National Championships – World Team Trials
|style="text-align:left;font-size:88%;" rowspan=8|
 Akron, Ohio
|-
|Loss
|27–14
|align=left| Luke Pletcher
|style="font-size:88%"|11–12
|-
|Win
|27–13
|align=left| Luke Pletcher
|style="font-size:88%"|8–5 
|-
|Win
|26–13
|align=left| Kanen Storr
|style="font-size:88%"|3–2
|-
|Win
|25–13
|align=left| Carter Happel
|style="font-size:88%"|TF 12–1
|-
|Win
|24–13
|align=left| John Burger
|style="font-size:88%"|TF 14–4
|-
|Win
|23–13
|align=left| Alex Hrisopoulos
|style="font-size:88%"|TF 12–2
|-
|Win
|22–13
|align=left| Christopher Lawley
|style="font-size:88%"|TF 10–0
|-
! style=background:white colspan=7 |
|-
|Loss
|21–13
|align=left| Frank Molinaro
|style="font-size:88%"|8–10
|style="font-size:88%" rowspan=4|May 17–19, 2019
|style="font-size:88%" rowspan=4|2019 US World Team Trials Challenge
|style="text-align:left;font-size:88%;" rowspan=4|
 Raleigh, North Carolina
|-
|Win
|21–12
|align=left| Dom Demas
|style="font-size:88%"|20–15
|-
|Win
|20–12
|align=left| Dean Heil
|style="font-size:88%"|TF 13–2
|-
|Loss
|19–12
|align=left| Frank Molinaro
|style="font-size:88%"|7–11
|-
! style=background:white colspan=7 |
|-
|Loss
|19–11
|align=left| Frank Molinaro
|style="font-size:88%"|5–8
|style="font-size:88%" rowspan=6|April 24–27, 2019
|style="font-size:88%" rowspan=6|2019 US Open National Championships
|style="text-align:left;font-size:88%;" rowspan=6|
 Las Vegas, Nevada
|-
|Loss
|19–10
|align=left| Zain Retherford
|style="font-size:88%"|3–11
|-
|Win
|19–9
|align=left| Dean Heil
|style="font-size:88%"|Fall
|-
|Win
|18–9
|align=left| Bryce Meredith
|style="font-size:88%"|Fall
|-
|Win
|17–9
|align=left| Joey Ward
|style="font-size:88%"|8–5
|-
|Win
|16–9
|align=left| Kyle Todrank
|style="font-size:88%"|TF 10–0
|-
! style=background:white colspan=7 |
|-
|Loss
|15–9
|align=left| George Bucur
|style="font-size:88%"|TF 10–21
|style="font-size:88%" rowspan=2|September 7–9, 2018
|style="font-size:88%" rowspan=2|2018 Poland Open
|style="text-align:left;font-size:88%;" rowspan=2|
 Warsaw, Poland
|-
|Win
|15–8
|align=left| Beka Lomtadze
|style="font-size:88%"|Fall
|-
! style=background:white colspan=7 |
|-
|Win
|14–8
|align=left| Andy Simmons
|style="font-size:88%"|9–5
|style="font-size:88%" |June 22–23, 2018
|style="font-size:88%" |2018 Final X: Lehigh - True thirds
|style="text-align:left;font-size:88%;" |
 Bethlehem, Pennsylvania
|-
|Loss
|13–8
|align=left| Logan Stieber
|style="font-size:88%"|1–7
|style="font-size:88%" rowspan=3|May 18–20, 2018
|style="font-size:88%" rowspan=3|2018 US World Team Trials Challenge
|style="text-align:left;font-size:88%;" rowspan=3|
 Rochester, Minnesota
|-
|Loss
|13–7
|align=left| Logan Stieber
|style="font-size:88%"|5–10
|-
|Win
|13–6
|align=left| Jayson Ness
|style="font-size:88%"|Fall
|-
! style=background:white colspan=7 |
|-
|Loss
|12–6
|align=left| Joey McKenna
|style="font-size:88%"|3–7
|style="font-size:88%" rowspan=5|April 24–28, 2018
|style="font-size:88%" rowspan=5|2018 US Open National Championships
|style="text-align:left;font-size:88%;" rowspan=5|
 Las Vegas, Nevada
|-
|Win
|12–5
|align=left| Nick Dardanes
|style="font-size:88%"|TF 10–0
|-
|Win
|11–5
|align=left| Logan Stieber
|style="font-size:88%"|6–5
|-
|Win
|10–5
|align=left| Jayson Ness
|style="font-size:88%"|7–4
|-
|Win
|9–5
|align=left| Jake Tanenbaum
|style="font-size:88%"|TF 14–4
|-
! style=background:white colspan=7 |
|-
|Win
|8–5
|align=left| Brock Zacherl
|style="font-size:88%"|5–4
|style="font-size:88%" rowspan=5|October 7–8, 2017
|style="font-size:88%" rowspan=5|2017 US U23 World Team Trials
|style="text-align:left;font-size:88%;" rowspan=5|
 Rochester, Minnesota
|-
|Win
|7–5
|align=left| Matt Findlay
|style="font-size:88%"|Fall
|-
|Loss
|6–5
|align=left| Boo Lewallen
|style="font-size:88%"|TF 5–15
|-
|Win
|6–4
|align=left| Devin Tortorice
|style="font-size:88%"|TF 11–1
|-
|Win
|5–4
|align=left| Logan Smith
|style="font-size:88%"|TF 11–0
|-
! style=background:white colspan=7 |
|-
|Loss
|4–4
|align=left| Kellen Russell
|style="font-size:88%"|TF 0–10
|style="font-size:88%" rowspan=2|June 9–10, 2017
|style="font-size:88%" rowspan=2|2017 US World Team Trials Challenge
|style="text-align:left;font-size:88%;" rowspan=2|
 Lincoln, Nebraska
|-
|Loss
|4–3
|align=left| Zain Retherford
|style="font-size:88%"|TF 2–14
|-
! style=background:white colspan=7 |
|-
|Loss
|4–2
|align=left| Mario Mason
|style="font-size:88%"|8–11
|style="font-size:88%" rowspan=3|May 19–22, 2017
|style="font-size:88%" rowspan=3|2017 US Last Chance Qualifier World Team Trials
|style="text-align:left;font-size:88%;" rowspan=3|
 Rochester, Minnesota
|-
|Win
|4–1
|align=left| Anthony Abidin
|style="font-size:88%"|Fall
|-
|Win
|3–1
|align=left| Michael Prieto
|style="font-size:88%"|TF 11–0
|-
! style=background:white colspan=7 |
|-
|Loss
|2–1
|align=left| Nick Dardanes
|style="font-size:88%"|TF 6–17
|style="font-size:88%" rowspan=4|April 24–27, 2017
|style="font-size:88%" rowspan=4|2017 US Open National Championships
|style="text-align:left;font-size:88%;" rowspan=4|
 Las Vegas, Nevada
|-
|Win
|2–0
|align=left| Devin Reynolds
|style="font-size:88%"|TF 16–6
|-
|Win
|1–0
|align=left| Leroy Barnes
|style="font-size:88%"|TF 10–0
|-
|NC
|0–0
|align=left| Jordan Oliver
|style="font-size:88%"|NC (overturned)
|-

NCAA record

! colspan="8"| NCAA Championships Matches
|-
!  Res.
!  Record
!  Opponent
!  Score
!  Date
!  Event
|-
! style=background:white colspan=6 |2021 NCAA Championships  at 141 lbs
|-
|Loss
|18–6
|align=left|Nick Lee
|style="font-size:88%"|SV 2–4
|style="font-size:88%" rowspan=5|March 18–20, 2021
|style="font-size:88%" rowspan=5|2021 NCAA Division I Wrestling Championships
|-
|Win
|18–5
|align=left|Tariq Wilson
|style="font-size:88%"|Fall
|-
|Win
|17–5
|align=left|Dresden Simon
|style="font-size:88%"|Fall
|-
|Win
|16–5
|align=left|Cole Matthews
|style="font-size:88%"|5–3
|-
|Win
|15–5
|align=left|Cayden Rooks
|style="font-size:88%"|TF 20–5
|-
! style=background:white colspan=6 |2019 NCAA Championships  at 141 lbs
|-
|Win
|14–5
|align=left|Dom Demas
|style="font-size:88%"|2–0
|style="font-size:88%" rowspan=6|March 21–23, 2019
|style="font-size:88%" rowspan=6|2019 NCAA Division I Wrestling Championships
|-
|Win
|13–5
|align=left|Mitch McKee
|style="font-size:88%"|8–5
|-
|Loss
|12–5
|align=left|Yianni Diakomihalis
|style="font-size:88%"|5–6
|-
|Win
|12–4
|align=left|Kyle Shoop
|style="font-size:88%"|8–3
|-
|Win
|11–4
|align=left|Cameron Kelly
|style="font-size:88%"|10–8
|-
|Win
|10–4
|align=left|Chris Debien
|style="font-size:88%"|Fall
|-
! style=background:white colspan=6 |2018 NCAA Championships 4th at 141 lbs
|-
|Loss
|9–4
|align=left|Joey McKenna
|style="font-size:88%"|2–7
|style="font-size:88%" rowspan=6|March 15–17, 2018
|style="font-size:88%" rowspan=6|2018 NCAA Division I Wrestling Championships
|-
|Win
|9–3
|align=left|Nick Lee 
|style="font-size:88%"|MD 12–4
|-
|Loss
|8–3
|align=left|Yianni Diakomihalis 
|style="font-size:88%"|SV–1 4–6
|-
|Win
|8–2
|align=left|Brock Zacherl 
|style="font-size:88%"|Fall
|-
|Win
|7–2
|align=left|Eli Stickley
|style="font-size:88%"|Fall
|-
|Win
|6–2
|align=left|Austin Headlee
|style="font-size:88%"|12–6
|-
! style=background:white colspan=6 |2017 NCAA Championships 5th at 141 lbs
|-
|Win
|5–2
|align=left|Anthony Ashnault
|style="font-size:88%"|5–2
|style="font-size:88%" rowspan=7|March 16–18, 2017
|style="font-size:88%" rowspan=7|2017 NCAA Division I Wrestling Championships
|-
|Loss
|4–2
|align=left|Bryce Meredith
|style="font-size:88%"|4–8
|-
|Win
|4–1
|align=left|Matt Kolodzik
|style="font-size:88%"|6–2
|-
|Win
|3–1
|align=left|Joey McKenna
|style="font-size:88%"|MD 8–0
|-
|Loss
|2–1
|align=left|Dean Heil
|style="font-size:88%"|5–6
|-
|Win
|2–0
|align=left|Colton McCrystal
|style="font-size:88%"|9–6
|-
|Win
|1–0
|align=left|Logan Everett
|style="font-size:88%"|MD 15–3
|-

Stats 

!  Season
!  Year
!  School
!  Rank
!  Weigh Class
!  Record
!  Win
!  Bonus
|-
|2021
|Senior
|University of Iowa
|#1 (2nd)
|rowspan=4|141
|12–1
|92.31%
|61.54%
|-
|2019
|Junior
|rowspan=3|University of Missouri
|#5 (3rd)
|28–4
|87.50%
|62.50%
|-
|2018
|Sophomore
|#2 (4th)
|34–3
|91.89%
|70.27%
|-
|2017
|Freshman
|#8 (5th)
|29–7
|80.56%
|44.44%
|-
|colspan=5 bgcolor="LIGHTGREY"|Career
|bgcolor="LIGHTGREY"|103–15
|bgcolor="LIGHTGREY"|87.29%
|bgcolor="LIGHTGREY"|61.02%

References

External links 
 

Living people
1996 births
Sportspeople from Columbia, Missouri
American male sport wrestlers
Pan American Games medalists in wrestling
Pan American Games bronze medalists for the United States
Wrestlers at the 2019 Pan American Games
Medalists at the 2019 Pan American Games
21st-century American people